The guided-rotor compressor (GRC) is a positive-displacement rotary gas compressor. The compression volume is defined by the trochoidally rotating rotor mounted on an eccentric drive shaft with a typical 80 to 85% adiabatic efficiency.

History

The development of the GRC started in 1990 to minimize the use of compressor valve  plates and springs by using simple inlet/discharge ports.

Uses
The guided-rotor compressor is under research as a hydrogen compressor for hydrogen stations and hydrogen pipeline transport.

See also

References

Gas compressors
Gas technologies